Jade Magnet was an online Crowdsourcing platform for creative and marketing support services. It was founded in 2009 by Sitashwa Srivastava and Manik Kinra. The company is headquartered in Bangalore, India and has white label partnerships in Qatar as Mixilion and in Singapore as id8on.

Jade Magnet crowdsources design requirements for marketing campaigns (logos, websites, brochures, print ads, animation videos) to freelancers, professionals, small agencies and technology from teams across the world. Initially established as an open crowdsourcing platform, Jade Magnet moved to a "managed crowdsourcing" model in 2013 wherein the company curates teams of designers from the crowd to provide solutions to its clients’. It offers delivery assurance to its clients and handles the full project management, payments and legal contracts of crowdsourced output.

Crowdsourcing gives businesses the option of choosing from multiple design possibilities, while at the same time, creates money-making opportunities for those with a creative bent-of-mind and a technology background. Businesses sourcing marketing and design requirements from Jade Magnet get to select from multiple designs submitted by different designers or "providers" to whom the task gets posted as a contest. In this way, the platform enables customers to extract multiple options for creative solutions before making a final selection. Crowdsourcing designers also makes available a larger pool of the best available talent from among freelancers, who would otherwise not be available within a single organisation or agency.

Designers can apply to become providers on the Jade Magnet network, and are then invited participate in live internal contests the ones that are of interest to them. Jade Magnet also sources designers and artists by visiting art schools and design colleges where there is a ready community willing to participate in any invitation for crowdsourcing ideas. Providers who perform well on projects and receive good customer feedback can become Jade Magnet Champions, which ensures them a steady stream of projects. Jade Magnet has developed a community engagement system for all providers (students, moonlighters, small agencies and freelancers), offering introductory skill appraisals, appraisal and accreditation based on client feedback and opportunities for creative skill enhancement. Some Jade Magnet providers are based in tier-2 cities of India and make a living with work coming from the platform.

Company history
Jade Magnet was co-founded by Sitashwa Srivastava and Manik Kinra, who were classmates at the Great Lakes Institute of Management. The company was born out of their idea to develop a crowdsourcing platform, based on the notion that solutions coming from a physically disconnected world could still serve business needs if channelled properly.

The idea behind establishing the company was to tap the market space comprising millions of small and medium businesses around the world which need creative support in their marketing campaigns but are unable to work with large creative agencies due to budget constraints. Crowdsourcing could cater to the needs of all such businesses on a single platform, bridging the gap between small businesses that could not afford big agency fee, and freelancers who are always looking for creative freedom and opportunity. Also, there was an opportunity to work for large and mature businesses in search of new creative ideas for their marketing campaigns and willing to experiment with more people than traditional agencies can provide.

There's a case study being written on why the business after scaling up couldn't reach the next level by professors in Great Lakes Institute of Management. The founders, Sitashwa has moved on to do startup in financial services vertical called Stockal while Manik has started a venture in Real Estate Space called Pin Click

Contest Based Platform
Under a pilot program for testing the business model by the name of creADivity, the founders brought on-board 45 providers and got their first five customers. In July 2008, creADivity got selected for The Indus Entrepreneurs’ (TiE) Entrepreneurial Acceleration Program (EAP), which selects one or two startup companies every year and assists in funding, mentoring and networking to support them. The program provides role models in successful entrepreneurs, and helps with the support required by early-stage entrepreneurs.

Joining the TiE Program also helped Manik and Sitashwa raise initial seed funding, with the help of which they launched the platform, rebranded by the name of Jade Magnet, on 15 October 2009. The name was changed from CreADivity since it was observed that people found it difficult to pronounce the name and place the brand. The company's new name was derived from Jade – a precious stone with sacred connotations in many cultures, and Magnet that signifies an ability to pull towards itself anything that comes close to it. The design of the company's logo itself was the result of a crowdsourcing exercise, where multiple designers created more than 15 design options. The logo that was finally chosen symbolises high-value by juxtaposing "a” and "g” together ("Ag" is the scientific name of silver), with the "g" falling slightly to represent the magnetic force of gravity.

Under the contest –based platform, customers looking crowdsourced design requirements could register on the website and post a project. Jade Magnet set a minimum payout limit for categories of creative projects, below which market dynamics have shown that there are no takers for given tasks. Customers post projects for a budget above the pre-set minimum, 80% of which is paid out to the winning entry. Once the project was posted as a contest, it received a number of entries from providers registered on the platform. Customers then shortlisted up to five entries from these and made a final choice after any modifications.

Providers looking to participate in design contests on the Jade Magnet platform registered on the website. Registered designers could participate in the projects of their interest and submit their work in response to the posted requirements. The client selected the design which was found most appropriate.

In its first three years of establishment, Jade Magnet got on board around 8000 freelancers and small agencies in its network, delivered more than 2000 design and technology projects to nearly 1000 customers, and awarded about $650,000 as prize money to designers.

Managed Crowdsourcing 
After trying out the open crowdsourcing model and a closed group delivery assurance for a few years, Jade Magnet moved to a Managed Crowdsourcing model in 2013, where they create teams of experts by bringing together the best providers. This helps get the best designs out as the first step from multiple designers and then work with the team to deliver the output to the client. Crowdsourcing thus helps businesses get access to a larger pool of the best available talent from among freelancers, who would otherwise not be available within a single organisation or agency.

Joint ventures

Mixilion  
In September 2012, Jade Magnet entered the Middle East with a joint venture as Mixilion, which is headquartered in Doha (Qatar). Mixilion is the Middle East's first crowdsourcing platform and provides solutions to SMEs in the region using Jade Magnet's technology back end and a localised delivery assurance model.

id8on  
In October 2012, Jade Magnet entered into a joint venture with a technology firm in Singapore as id8on, with the help of which it expanded its operations in the Asia-Pacific (APAC) region.

Products
The creative marketing solutions provided by Jade Magnet include:

Logo/brand designs
Advertisements (banner ads for online campaigns, print ads for print campaigns and billboard ads for out-of-home campaigns)
Web design (basic websites, dynamic websites, microsites, prototypical platforms)
Brochure designs
Animation videos
Application UI
Digital marketing
Online Marketing (including search engine optimisation and social media marketing)
Template designs of other marketing collateral like newsletters, stationery, emailers, power point presentations and document templates

Platform technology 
The key to scaling the crowdsourcing business lies in automation of as many crowd-management processes as possible and Jade Magnet has created, executed, analysed and fine-tuned many such processes. Jade Magnet is built on the Symfony framework with a MySQL back-end. The platform is a cloud-hosted application at Amazon Web Services. Jade Magnet is building a new sales support and portfolio application that organises collateral designs by category and cost to enable Jade Magnet sales team and account managers close deals faster. It doubles up as a design showcase for provider portfolios at Jade Magnet.

Partnerships
Wanobe in October 2011 to provide services to Small and Medium Businesses in UK
Indiamart in December 2011, to enhance the marketing strategies of SMEs and cater to their needs of design solutions cost effectively
Zipdial in December 2011 to provide collaborative solutions to SMEs in India
Appsfunder in January 2012 for cross-marketing each other's services into their communities
Kuliza Technologies in April 2012 to get Indian SMEs Online on Amazon
Design Partner at the NASSCOM Product Conclave, 2012

Awards and recognition
Selected by TiE for its Entrepreneurial Acceleration Program (EAP) and raised seed capital with TiE support (2009)
Selected among India's Hottest Startups by Business Today magazine (2010)
Most promising technology startup at Global Technology Summit, Palo Alto(2011)
Featured in TiE Global Annual Report among promising startups (2011)
Selected by NASSCOM as part of the EMERGE 50 group of companies in India (2011)
Nominated for South Asia's Manthan Awards as an innovative digital business (2011)
Case study on Jade Magnet was among the winning cases chosen for publishing in 2012 at the ISB-Ivey Global Case Competition 2012, organised by the Indian School of Business
Case study on Jade Magnet on Harvard Business Review

See also
Crowdsourcing
Crowdsourcing creative work
List of crowdsourcing projects

References

External links
Official website
Jade Magnet Annual Report, 2012

Jade
Companies based in Bangalore
Internet properties established in 2009
Privately held companies of India
Project hosting websites
Graphic design
Digital marketing companies of India
Indian companies established in 2009
2009 establishments in Karnataka